Mukhamed Shakirov (born 19 March 1933) is a Soviet long-distance runner. He competed in the marathon at the 1968 Summer Olympics.

References

External links
 

1933 births
Living people
Athletes (track and field) at the 1968 Summer Olympics
Soviet male long-distance runners
Soviet male marathon runners
Olympic athletes of the Soviet Union